Heterocampinae is a subfamily of prominent moths in the family Notodontidae. There are at least 60 described species of Heterocampinae in North America.

Genera
 Afilia Schaus, 1901
 Disphragis Hübner, 1820
 Euhyparpax Beutenmüller, 1893
 Heterocampa Doubleday, 1841
 Hyparpax Hübner, 1825
 Litodonta Harvey, 1876
 Lochmaeus Doubleday, 1841
 Macrurocampa Dyar, 1893
 Misogada Walker, 1865
 Oligocentria Herrich-Schäffer, 1855
 Praeschausia Benjamin, 1932
 Pseudhapigia Schaus, 1901
 Rifargia Walker, 1862
 Scevesia Dyar, 1916
 Schizura Doubleday, 1841
 Theroa Schaus, 1901
 Ursia Barnes & McDunnough, 1911

References

 Lafontaine, J. Donald & Schmidt, B. Christian (2010). "Annotated check list of the Noctuoidea (Insecta, Lepidoptera) of North America north of Mexico". ZooKeys, vol. 40, 1-239.

Further reading

External links

 Butterflies and Moths of North America
 NCBI Taxonomy Browser, Heterocampinae

Notodontidae